Central Rama 2 (previously known as Central Plaza Rama 2) is a shopping center located on Rama II Road in Bang Khun Thian District, Bangkok, Thailand. The mall opened in 2002. Central Rama II can support people from the Thonburi, Jomthong, and Bangkhuntien areas. People from nearly provinces such as Samut Sakhon and Samut Songkhram also visit this shopping center. Foreign workers also often visit here.

Overview 
The shopping center has a total of five floors. The shopping center is located on the main highway south of Bangkok in a rapidly expanding and densely populated residential area. The plaza has a retail shopping center, a Central Department Store, a supermarket, a food court, a 38-lane bowling alley and a 9-screen cinema multiplex.

Anchors 
 Central Department Store
 Tops Supermarket
 Tops Food Hall
 Tops Club
 Major Cineplex 9 Cinemas
 Power Buy x B2S
 Officemate
 Supersports
 Food Park
 Food Patio
 Fitness First
 Rama II Hall

Construction
Construction of CentralPlaza Rama 2 began in November, 2000 by K-TECH construction public company limited. The client is Central Pattana PCL. This project included a five-storey building with a basement. Central Rama 2 has a total usage area of 260,000 sq. m. The total area is 96 rai including architecture, power line and M&E works. The budget of this project is 4075 million baht. The theme of this shopping center is galaxy of the universe.

Parking
The shopping center has a carpark with a parking space for some 3120 cars.

Nearby attractions
 Nakornthon Hospital Major regional hospital located 500m south-west on the same side of Rama II.
 Residence
 Park Village Rama 2
 Vista Park Rama 2
 Town Avenue Cocos Rama 2
 Golden Neo Rama 2
 Pruksa Ville 68 Rama2
 The Grand Rama 2
Education
BASIS International School of Bangkok is a top-tier International School located adjacent to Central Park.
Hands On Education Consultant
Kido Educare Center
Business
TCI global ventures

See also 
 List of shopping malls in Thailand

External links 
 Central Group website

Notes

References 
 
 

Shopping malls in Bangkok
Central Pattana
Bang Khun Thian district
Shopping malls established in 2002
2002 establishments in Thailand